Carnaval San Francisco, established 1979, is an annual street parade and festival in San Francisco, California, United States, held on the last weekend in May.

About 
Carnaval San Francisco, is a free two-day annual family festival in San Francisco's Mission District over Memorial Day weekend, held on Harrison Street between 16th and 24th Streets, Guests can experience global cuisine, international music, dance, arts & crafts, and other fun activities and entertainment on every street corner for the entire family to enjoy. Carnaval San Francisco is the largest multi–cultural celebration on the West Coast.

History

Carnaval San Francisco was founded by a group of artists organized by percussionist Marcus Gordon, dancer Adela Chu, and costume designer Pam Minor in 1979, who came together in Precita Park. The second Carnaval San Francisco was held in the Mission District's Dolores Park.

Since 2003, the Carnaval Grand Parade has run through the Mission District of San Francisco. The event is produced by Mission Neighborhood Centers as a fundraiser for youth, children, family and senior programs. The Cultural Arts Committee (CAC) of MNC together with the Carnaval Advisory Committee oversee the administration of the parade and festival, which contract with long-time Mission District activist Roberto Hernandez to run the event. For the 2009 Carnaval the production of the parade and festival was turned over to event production company Rita Barela & Associates, while the CAC produced the other official events including the King and Queen Competition.

In 2016, the theme "¡Viva La Madre Tierra!" celebrated Mother Earth's prevalence in many cultures worldwide as the manifestation of the natural world. There was a virtual carnaval in 2020.

Special events

VIP Party at the de Young Museum 

The de Young Museum hosts the official Carnaval Kick Off Party the week before the festival and parade. This free event features energetic dancers, fabulous costumes and a preview of what's to come at the Mission District extravaganza.

King and Queen Competition 

In April, Carnaval San Francisco embarks on a journey to select the annual King and Queen. Contestants vie for the crowns with performances in Carnaval costumes, sometimes accompanied by other dancers and musicians. The winners of the competition will be crowned as King and Queen of the Annual Carnaval San Francisco Parade and Festival held at the end of May. Contest winners serve as the Official Ambassadors at the Carnaval San Francisco Grand Parade and win a $500 cash prize.

Season Kick-Off: Fat Tuesday 

In February, Carnaval San Francisco invites everyone to meet their neighbors and make new friends at their Annual Fat Tuesday Mardi Gras Celebration at three venues in the Mission. This features live music and dancers winding their way through the party. Fat Tuesday is the event which kicks off the Carnaval SF season. Guests can wear costumes, masks and beads and celebrate Fat Tuesday in true Carnaval SF style.

See also

 Mission Cultural Center for Latino Arts

References

External links
 Carnaval San Francisco
 

1979 establishments in California
Caribbean-American culture
Carnival in the United States
Culture of San Francisco
Festivals in the San Francisco Bay Area
Hispanic and Latino American culture in San Francisco
Mission District, San Francisco
Festivals established in 1979